Kropufinskaya is a rural locality (a village) in Beketovskoye Rural Settlement, Vozhegodsky District, Vologda Oblast, Russia. The population was 38 as of 2002.

Geography 
Kropufinskaya is located 76 km southwest of Vozhega (the district's administrative centre) by road. Nikulskaya is the nearest rural locality.

References 

Rural localities in Vozhegodsky District